The 1937 Tschammerpokal was the 3rd season of the annual German football cup competition. In the final which was held on 9 January 1938 in the Müngersdorfer Stadion (Cologne) Schalke 04 defeated Fortuna Düsseldorf, 2–1. It was Schalke's third consecutive appearance in the final and their first victory in the cup.

Matches

First round

Replay

Second round

Round of 16

Replay

Quarter-finals

Semi-finals

Final

References

External links
 Official site of the DFB 
 Kicker.de 
 Tschammerpokal at Fussballberichte.de 

1937
1937 in German football cups